Zadonbeh may refer to:
 Zadonbeh-ye Bala
 Zadonbeh-ye Pain